The 2019 season was FC Sheriff Tiraspol's 23rd season, and their 22nd in the Divizia Naţională, the top-flight of Moldovan football. Sheriff defended their Divizia Naţională title, winning it for the 18th time whilst also winning the 2018–19 Moldovan Cup and progressing to the Quarterfinal stage of the 2019–20 Moldovan Cup that will take place in the 2020 season. In Europe, Sheriff were knocked out of the Champions League by Saburtalo Tbilisi in the first qualifying round and then by AIK at the third qualifying round of the Europa League.

Season events
On 27 April, Goran Sablić resigned as manager, with Zoran Zekić returning as manager on 30 April.
On 14 November, Cristiano extended his contract with Sheriff Tiraspol, which was due to end at the end of the 2020 season.

Squad

Out on loan

Transfers

In

Loans in

Out

Loans out

Released

Friendlies

Competitions

Moldovan Super Cup

Divizia Națională

Results summary

Results

League table

Moldovan Cup

2018–19

Final

2019–20

Semifinals took place during the 2020 season.

UEFA Champions League

Qualifying rounds

UEFA Europa League

Qualifying rounds

Squad Statistics

Appearances and goals

|-
|colspan="16"|Players away on loan :

|-
|colspan="16"|Players who left Sheriff Tiraspol during the season:

|}

Goal scorers

Disciplinary Record

Notes

References

External links 
 

FC Sheriff Tiraspol seasons
Sheriff Tiraspol
Sheriff Tiraspol
Moldovan football clubs 2018–19 season
Moldovan football clubs 2019–20 season